Sphaerocoryne affinis (notable synonyms: Mitrella mesnyi) is a species of flowering plant in the soursop family, Annonaceae. The fragrant flowers of Sphaerocoryne affinis are highly regarded in Cambodia and Thailand.

Description
This plant has a yellowish-white flower with a single alternate leaf. It has a height of 8–12 m and a stem diameter of 20–30 cm. It gives out an attractive smell in the late afternoon and evening, a distinctive fragrance that can be smelled from a long distance.

Cultural significance

In Cambodia
The rumduol, as it is known in Cambodia, is often planted in gardens and parks as it is valued for its fragrance. The flowers are used to make a scented lip wax called kramuon rumduol. Several regions in Cambodia are named after this flower, such as Romdoul District and Ou Rumduol.

In a 2005 royal decree by King Sihamoni of Cambodia, the rumduol was proclaimed the national flower of Cambodia, however this decree references an invalid synonym for this taxon, Mitrella mesnyi. The rumduol is often referred to as Popowia aberrans on botanical signs and as noted by Headley in the Cambodian-English dictionary.

References

External links
 Thaiherb 
 ASEAN National Flowers
 National flower of the Kingdom of Cambodia

Annonaceae
Cambodian culture
National symbols of Cambodia
Sisaket province
Trees of Cambodia
Trees of Thailand